The iSONEWS was a warez news website. It was originally created by orm who later deferred management of the website to krazy8 and mandarin. TheiSONews supplied release details and NFOs of warez games and programs, without actually supplying them, or supplying any information on where to find them. Later it was also called a fan site that has become an unofficial hub of DivX news.

Domain seizure

On February 28 2003, the United States Department of Justice seized the isonews domain name, however its servers remained intact. The closure of the isonews.com domain brought more attention to the site, and after the site was back up on mirror sites, the membership and the user activity on the forums increased.

Approximately one year following the seizure, visitors to iSONEWS.com were redirected to the United States Department of Justice cybercrime.gov website.  As of November 16, 2004, the original domain, is owned by DomainSpa LLC and used to advertise video game sales and rentals.

David "krazy8" Rocci got a sentence of 5 months in federal prison and a $28,500 fine for selling modchips on isonews.com. Krazy8 later indicated that modchips was the 'official' modus operandi, but every question I was ever asked related to ISONews and had nothing to do with modchips.

Current status

From being a release site for the warez community, the site has evolved into a broader message board, concentrating mostly on PC gaming. The PC games forum on the site contains everything from rumors, latest news, hints, tips and tweaks to various games. As of June 2007, the releases are never updated, however the forums are still (barely) in use.

See also 
 .nfo
 Standard (warez)

References

External links 
 theisonews.com
 Site Returns After Piracy Crackdown
 The Register DoJ seizes ISOnews site over Xbox mod chip sales
 Put a Z in ISONews - DoJ seizure is 'illegal and abusive'
 
  - US DoJ press release on bust
 
 
 
 

Warez
Internet forums
Domain name seizures by United States